Kannada University, also called Hampi Kannada University or Hampi University or Kannada University, Hampi, is a public research university in Hampi, Karnataka, founded in 1991 by the Government of Karnataka through the Kannada University Act, 1991, with the aim to develop the Kannada language and to promote the literature, traditions, culture, and folklore of Karnataka. The university confers "Nadoja" awards, every year, which is equivalent to an Honorary Doctor of Literature (D.Litt) degree. The award instituted by the university is given to eminent personalities for their contribution in various fields.

References

External links
Official website of the Kannada University

Universities in Karnataka
Educational institutions established in 1991
1991 establishments in Karnataka
Hampi
Academic language institutions